The Treaty of Dordrecht was signed on 14 February 1489 between Holy Roman Emperor Maximilian I and King Henry VII of England. Based on the terms of the treaty, both parties agreed to establish an alliance in order to help the Bretons.

See also
List of treaties

External links
Tudor Chronology

1480s in the Holy Roman Empire
1489 in Europe
Tudor England
Dordrecht (1489)
Dordrecht (1489)
1480s treaties
1489 in England
Medieval Brittany
History of Dordrecht
England–Holy Roman Empire relations
Maximilian I, Holy Roman Emperor
Henry VII of England